The Verity Bargate Award is a British theatre award for new writing. It was established in 1981–82 in memory of Verity Bargate, the founder of the Soho Theatre.

Winners

1983
 Shona, by Tony Craze
 Lunch Girls, by Ron Hart
 The Shelter, by Johnnie Quarrell

1984
 Up For None, by Mick Mahoney
 Coming Apart, by Melissa Murray

1985
The Bombdies  Julie Dennis

1986
 Releevo, by David Spencer
 Smith, by Johnnie Quarrell (runner-up)
 Made in Spain, by Tony Grounds (runner-up)

1987
 James Bonney MP, by Ian Buckley (shortlist)

1988
 Me and My Friend, by Gillian Plowman
 Obeah, by Michele Celeste
 Here is Monster, by Brock Norman Brock

1989
 Dogs, Sons of Dogs! Murderers!! Fascists!!!, by Michele Celeste

1990
 Killing the Cat, by David Spencer

1991
 Water Music, by Lyndon Morgans

References

British theatre awards
Dramatist and playwright awards